John "J." Jonah Jameson Jr. is a fictional character appearing in American comic books published by Marvel Comics, most commonly in association with the superhero Spider-Man. The character was created by writer Stan Lee and artist Steve Ditko, and he first appeared in The Amazing Spider-Man issue #1 (March 1963).

Jameson is typically depicted as the publisher or editor-in-chief of the Daily Bugle, a fictional New York City newspaper. Recognizable by his toothbrush moustache, flattop haircut, and ever-present cigar, he carries out a smear campaign against Spider-Man (and to a lesser extent other superheroes such as Daredevil), frequently referring to him as a "menace" and a criminal, but occasionally and reluctantly allying with him. This usually stems from his deep-seated belief in law enforcement and government agencies, and thus despises superheroes for working outside the system. In the early comics as well as most media interpretations, he employs photojournalist Peter Parker to take pictures of Spider-Man in the hopes of catching him in the middle of wrongdoing, unaware that Peter is the superhero himself. Over the course of the comics, Jameson has done various other jobs, most notably being the Mayor of New York City for several years before resigning. Peter has revealed his identity to Jameson twice: the first during the "Civil War" event, which was undone by the events of the "One More Day"; and the second years later, which caused him to finally give up his crusade on Spider-Man and become a permanent ally and advocate of him. 

Portrayals of Jameson in both the comics and external media have varied throughout the years. Sometimes he is shown as a foolishly grumpy, stubborn and pompous micromanager whose resentment of Spider-Man is actually a thinly-veiled exercise in envy. Other writers have portrayed him more empathetically, as a humorously obnoxious yet caring boss and family man who nevertheless has shown great bravery and integrity in the face of the assorted villains with which the Bugle comes into contact, and whose campaign against Spider-Man comes more from the aforementioned political motivations. He and Peter Parker are related by marriage as a result of his father's wedding to May Parker. Jameson's son John Jameson is a Marvel Universe supporting character who, in addition to his job as a famous astronaut, has become Man-Wolf and Star-God and also married She-Hulk, making Jonah her father-in-law before she and John divorced. In addition to Man-Wolf, he also serves as a principal figure in the creation of Spider-Man foes Spider-Slayer and Scorpion.

The character has appeared in numerous media adaptations related to Spider-Man; he usually assumes his early role as Peter's employer, but this has lessened in recent years as depictions of Spider-Man focused around his science and superhero careers, with Jameson simply being Spider-Man's tormentor. Most famously, J. K. Simmons portrayed the character in Sam Raimi's Spider-Man trilogy (2002–2007) and in the Marvel Cinematic Universe films Spider-Man: Far From Home (2019) and Spider-Man: No Way Home (2021). Simmons also voices him in various additional works, such as Ultimate Spider-Man.

Publication history
Created by writer Stan Lee and artist Steve Ditko, Jameson first appeared in The Amazing Spider-Man issue #1 (March 1963). Stan Lee stated in an interview on Talk of the Nation that he modeled J. Jonah Jameson as a much grumpier version of himself. Later Spider-Man writers Tom DeFalco and Gerry Conway agreed that J. Jonah Jameson was as close as Lee ever came to a self-portrayal, with Conway elaborating that "just like Stan is a very complex and interesting guy who both has a tremendously charismatic part of himself and is an honestly decent guy who cares about people, he also has this incredible ability to go immediately to shallow. Just, BOOM, right to shallow. And that's Jameson". Conway stated that whenever he wrote Jameson's dialogue, he would hear it in Lee's voice, and on one occasion even wrote a Jameson speech that was almost directly quoted from a Stan Lee speech.

The Spider-Man creative staff considered Jameson's wedding to Marla Madison in Amazing Spider-Man Annual #18 (1984) a momentous enough event that they asked Stan Lee to script the story, while the art team on the issue emulated Steve Ditko's style.

Jameson has been a mainstay of the Spider-Man supporting cast, and on a few rare occasions has been given a starring role, including Peter Parker, the Spectacular Spider-Man #80 (July 1983), Web of Spider-Man #52 (July 1989) (in which Spider-Man himself only appears in a single panel), and Spider-Man's Tangled Web #20 (January 2003).

Fictional character biography

Background
According to "Behind the Mustache", a story featured in Spider-Man's Tangled Web #20 (January 2003), Jameson was raised as a child by David and Betty Jameson. David was an officer of the United States Army, a war veteran decorated as a hero; at home, however, David regularly abused his wife and son. As a result, J. Jonah Jameson grew convinced that "No one's a hero every day of the week" and "Even the real heroes can't keep it up all the time". Later issues of The Amazing Spider-Man clarified that David Jameson was in fact Jonah's foster father, and the brother of J. Jonah Jameson Sr., Jonah's biological father, who had to leave his son behind for undisclosed reasons.

He was a Boy Scout during his childhood. In high school, his interests were mainly boxing and photography. He met his first wife, Joan, when they both joined their high school's photo club. When the school's three top athletes started bullying him, he fought back and beat all three of them to a pulp. This impressed Joan, and they started dating. They married as soon as they finished school.

After school, Jameson sought employment as a journalist. In Marvels #1, a young reporter brags to his colleagues that he would one day run the Daily Bugle; according to writer Kurt Busiek, he and artist Alex Ross intended this to be J. Jonah Jameson, but the editor of the Spider-Man line objected that Jameson was too young to have been alive during the early 1940s, when the story was set. Since it was too late to redraw the scene, the editor settled for having Jameson's name removed from the issue. When the U.S.A. joined World War II in 1941, Jameson served as a war correspondent in Europe. Sergeant Fury and His Howling Commandos #110 featured him as covering a mission of Sergeant Nicholas Fury, who was heading a team of commandos during the war.

After the war, he and Joan had a son, John Jonah III, who grew up to become an astronaut. When Jameson returned from a journalistic mission in Korea, he was grieved to find that his wife had died in a mugging incident. Focusing on his professional life to dull the pain, he was promoted to chief editor of the Daily Bugle, and eventually came to own the paper, thereby fulfilling his earlier boasts.

Jameson gained a mostly deserved reputation for journalistic integrity, but his greedy opportunism and unyielding belligerent stubbornness made him more than a few enemies.

Spider-Man 

J. Jonah Jameson was part of the audience that saw the Amazing Spider-Man's first TV broadcast. However, when Spider-Man becomes a masked vigilante, Jameson strives to blacken Spider-Man's reputation; casting the masked hero as an unhinged vigilante not only boosts the Daily Bugles circulation, but also punishes Spider-Man for overshadowing Jameson's astronaut son. When Spider-Man tries to counter the bad press by rescuing his son from danger, Jameson accuses the hero of staging the situation for his own benefit.

This episode sets a pattern with Jameson's and Spider-Man's relationship: Jameson publicly accusing Spider-Man of numerous crimes and misdeeds, only to feel continually obliged to print almost as many retractions after being proven wrong. The lead story of the following issue, Amazing Spider-Man #2 (May 1963), sets another part of the pattern: Peter Parker selling pictures of himself as Spider-Man to the Bugle with few questions asked, and Jonah using the pictures to support his editorials against Spider-Man, unaware that he is giving him gainful employment in the process. After his accusations that Spider-Man is the notorious criminal overlord The Big Man are debunked, Jameson admits that he is jealous of Spider-Man's courage and selflessness. Jameson believes that he cannot look at himself as a good man while a hero like Spider-Man exists. Despite this, he openly idolizes Captain America, and Mary Jane Watson-Parker has suggested that Jameson hates Spider-Man mainly because he acts outside the law. A psychiatrist suggests that it is the mask that bothers him, and that when Jameson sees people who "claimed to be heroes, but covered their faces", he is subconsciously sure that they're hiding a horrible secret like his foster father was. While interviewing Spider-Man years later, Jameson says that he used to think that he was jealous, or worried about children endangering themselves by following the hero's example, but says that the mask is why he dislikes Spider-Man.

Though Jonah's rancor against Spider-Man at times subsides after he saves the life of one of his loved ones, his determination to find some flaw in the hero always returns before long. For his part, Spider-Man's reaction ranges from frustration and anger at the ungrateful publisher, which leads to occasional pranks to antagonize him, to an amused acceptance of his self-destructive stubbornness.

Jameson posts rewards for Spider-Man's capture or secret identity, hunts him with Spencer Smythe's Spider-Slayer robots, and even commissions superpowered agents to defeat the masked man. He hires a private detective named MacDonald Gargan, puts him through a regimen of genetic enhancement, and transforms him into the Scorpion - only to have Gargan go insane and turn on his benefactor. Although Spider-Man protects Jameson from the Scorpion, Jameson keeps his role in creating the Scorpion secret for years. He creates another superbeing, who turned into a supervillain, the Human Fly, who had his own vendetta against him. He hires Silver Sable and her Wild Pack to hunt Spider-Man down, and also hires Luke Cage to capture Spider-Man when he is wanted for the deaths of Gwen Stacy and Norman Osborn. On another occasion, he offers Electro a five-thousand-dollar reward (1970 dollars, worth $19,300.00 today) to mount a surprise attack against Spider-Man during a television interview.

Though best known for his crusades against vigilante superheroes like Spider-Man, Jameson never hesitates to use the power of his paper against supervillains, crooked politicians, and crime bosses, including the Kingpin. (In fact, the Kingpin's attempt to silence Jameson, and Spider-Man's attempt to rescue him, are central plot-elements in the Kingpin's very first appearance.) After initially supporting Sam Bullitt, a candidate for New York Attorney General who had pledged to arrest Spider-Man if elected, Jameson reverses his stance after learning that Bullitt is a racist crook. He publishes a major exposé on mayoral candidate Randolf Cherryh's criminal ties, acknowledging in advance that a retaliatory lawsuit from Cherryh could bankrupt the Daily Bugle. Jameson later takes an aggressive stance against presidential candidate Graydon Creed, attacking him for his anti-mutant agenda and investigating the shadowy Operation: Zero Tolerance, though he never manages to uncover the truth. He is also a longtime crusader for civil rights, having expressed disgust for racial prejudice on several occasions and has also campaigned for labor and mutant rights.

Family ties
In Amazing Spider-Man #162 (November 1976), Jameson introduces himself to Dr. Marla Madison, a distinguished scientist and daughter of a deceased friend of his. He asks for her help in creating a new Spider-Slayer, one of a series of robots created to defeat Spider-Man, although Spider-Man has managed to survive their attacks and destroy each of them. Madison is interested in the challenge, and joins Jameson in his efforts. The two grow closer, eventually marrying but not without another attack from the Scorpion, who kidnaps Marla and is defeated by Spider-Man. Jameson remains a devoted, if a little overprotective, husband to his second wife.

Marla Madison adopts Mattie Franklin, her niece and the daughter of one of Jonah's friends. Though Jonah is initially opposed to having a roguish teenager in his house, especially one who insists on affectionately calling him "Unca Jonah", he soon warms up to Mattie, coming to regard her almost as a surrogate daughter. Two weeks after Mattie is abducted for illegal harvesting of mutant growth hormone, private investigators Jessica Drew and Jessica Jones track her down and inform Jonah and Marla that Mattie is also the vigilante Spider-Woman. For saving Mattie, Jonah heavily promotes Jones' agency and later hires her as a reporter for the Bugle'''s new Pulse magazine.

Relinquishing control
The guilt for creating the Scorpion catches up with Jameson when the Hobgoblin blackmails him about it. When he receives the threats, rather than succumb to the Hobgoblin, Jameson chooses instead to reveal it to the world in a public editorial. He steps down as the Bugles editor-in-chief, delegating the post to his immediate subordinate, Joseph "Robbie" Robertson, but Jameson remains its publisher.

Jonah's control of the Daily Bugle is bought out from under him by multimillionaire Thomas Fireheart. Fireheart had felt that he owed Spider-Man a debt of honor and in an attempt to repay the hero, he purchases the Daily Bugle and begins a pro-Spider-Man campaign. Jameson starts up a rival magazine which continues to produce anti-Spider-Man articles.Web of Spider-Man #65 Spider-Man finds Fireheart's campaign embarrassing at best, and after he repeatedly demands that he stop, Fireheart challenges the web-slinger to a battle to the death in New Mexico. He then sells the Bugle back to Jameson for the sum of one dollar, on the condition that he print an obituary "For either me, or Spider-Man". Jameson, though shocked by the request, takes the deal.

He is blackmailed into selling the Bugle to Norman Osborn after threats were made against his family; simultaneously, he is attacked and hounded by the supervillain Mad Jack. The time spent as a subordinate to Osborn took a heavy mental toll, almost driving him to attempted murder, but he is finally able to reclaim the Bugle after Osborn is driven underground by temporary insanity.

"Death"
When a duplicate of Spider-Man created by Mysterio jumps in front of Jameson's car while he is driving home from work one day, Jameson crashes his car into a tree. He is believed to have been killed in the car crash, dying upon impact, and the media blames Spider-Man for his tragic and untimely demise. Later, he is shown ascending to "the light", only for him to be condemned for all the injustices he committed in life. He is then shown descending into Mysterio's staged version of Hell, where he is tormented by a Spider-Man-themed demon, though this is revealed to just be a part of Mysterio's revenge on Jameson, but Spider-Man rescues him.

Spider-Man unmasked
Jameson's influence on the paper as its publisher is shown in the 2006–2007 Civil War: Front Line when he pressures his staff into supporting the federal government's Superhuman Registration Act, still directing the general tone of the paper, despite losing his more hands-on position. When Spider-Man unmasks and reveals himself to be Peter Parker, Jameson faints in shock at the realization that the man he had been calling a menace had actually been on his payroll for years. On top of the Parker revelation, Jameson is forced to deal with the notion that She-Hulk had now become his daughter-in-law. This was not helped by the fact that She-Hulk and Spider-Man had previously sued him for libel.

It has been since revealed that Jameson had always believed that between him and Peter Parker was a bond of trust and he had always regarded him as another son, the "last honest man" in the world; he had always bought his photos, even the ones that he considered inferior, to help him in a discreet manner. After Peter's public confession, Jameson feels so betrayed and humiliated that it shatters their bond. He is determined to make Peter "pay", despite Parker (as enforcer) and Jameson both actively supporting the Superhuman Registration Act. He plans to sue Parker for fraud, demanding back all the money he paid Peter over the years. However, he learns that the government has granted Parker amnesty for all the acts he had done to protect his secret identity, which included taking photos of himself. Both this and his son's marriage to She-Hulk drive Jameson into a fit of rage, and he attacks his new daughter-in-law with the original Spider-Slayer. She easily destroys it, and to smooth things over, remarks that she will handle the lawsuit for fraud against Spider-Man (while privately intending to drag it out as long as possible).

Spider-Man later defects from the government's side in enforcing the Registration Act and joins with Captain America's Secret Avengers, openly rebelling against the new law and fighting those attempting to enforce it. Issues of Friendly Neighborhood Spider-Man reveal that Jameson posted a reward to bring in Peter. He also commits libel against Parker by coercing Peter's old girlfriend Debra Whitman into writing an untrue account of him; Betty Brant has secretly supplied information about this to The Daily Globe, which then published a front-page exposé.

In the most recent development, Jameson's editor-in-chief and closest friend Robbie Robertson stands up to Jameson and his shoddy treatment of Peter/Spider-Man over the years. Unable or unwilling to admit that he has gone too far in his hatred of Spider-Man, Jameson fires Robertson. Later, Spider-Man learns of this from Betty Brant and decides that he and Jameson should have a long overdue "chat". Some time later, Jameson visits the Robertson house with a bottle of wine, two black eyes, and a broken hand. He tells Robbie that he discovered his office at the Bugle covered with webbing, with a note attached telling him to meet Spider-Man at an old gangster lair. Spider-Man tried to persuade Jameson to rehire Robbie, and Jameson gave him a choice: to have the lawsuit against him dropped, or for Robbie to be rehired. Spider-Man chose the former, revealing that he did so because he believes Jameson only fired Robbie to get a rise out of him. Spider-Man then told Jameson to hit him, as many times as he'd like, to finally work out his frustrations. Jameson was initially reluctant, until Spider-Man started goading him, threatening to inform his wife and son of his "cowardice". Jameson snapped, and started hitting Spider-Man again and again and again, resulting in his broken hand. When it was over, Spider-Man went into the rafters and brought Jameson back a roll of film, containing pictures of their "fight", telling him the photographs depicting him standing back and letting Jameson beat him up would sell "a gazillion copies", and left. Later, at the Bugle, Jameson crushed the film with his foot, not knowing quite why he was doing it. As he turned to leave, Betty Brant accidentally hit him in the face with a door, resulting in his two black eyes. Back in the present, Jameson tells Robbie of his decision to rehire him and to drop the lawsuit against Peter.

Heart attacks and recuperation
Jameson has his first heart attack, a mild one, in The Amazing Spider-Man #70, while being threatened by Spider-Man when the latter finally loses his temper after many years of abuse and defamation.

After the status quo was revised in the "Brand New Day" storyline, Peter's identity is once again a secret. The Daily Bugle has hit hard times with Peter not selling as many Spider-Man pictures as usual and star reporter Ben Urich gone. These circumstances led to Jonah facing a buyout from the wealthy Dexter Bennett. This forced Jonah to stop everyone's checks to build the capital needed to save the paper, with everyone at the Bugle working temporarily for free as a sign of solidarity. Needing money for an apartment, Peter came to the Bugle claiming he was owed money, to which Jonah yelled at him, causing Peter to snap and yell back, stating that his photographs kept the Bugle selling while Jonah raked in the profits and paid Peter a pittance. This caused Jonah to yell at Peter again, but he stopped short owing to a second heart attack.

Peter spent an unknown period of time giving Jonah CPR to try and save him until the paramedics arrived; upon arriving they rushed Jonah to the hospital where he was depicted resting before surgery. His wife began talking to a lawyer about power of attorney and selling the final shares of the Bugle without Jonah having a say. When Peter, as Spider-Man, paid a visit, he accidentally let slip that the Daily Bugle has sold to Dexter Bennett, which caused Jonah to have another heart attack, forcing Spider-Man to once again give him CPR. Surprisingly, Jonah did not blame Spider-Man for once, but instead he just kept on muttering, "Dexter Bennett".

Jonah's condition later improved, to the point where he takes physiotherapy sessions and t'ai chi classes. However, he loses his temper if he sees or hears about Dexter Bennett and the D.B. He is also apparently facing problems with his wife, as he has yet to forgive her for selling the Bugle.

Mayor of New York
In a 2009 storyline, Jameson is elected the Mayor of New York City Spider-Man is in another dimension with the Fantastic Four, resulting in a month going by on Earth while they are only away for a few hours. In his new office, Jonah receives a visit from his estranged father, J. Jonah Jameson Sr., demanding that Jonah cease his vendetta against Spider-Man - the reasons being Spider-Man's many heroic deeds and the fact that the Avengers and even Captain America had accepted Spider-Man. Spider-Man then enters the mayor's office (hoping to establish a truce with Jameson) only for Jonah to announce that he has assembled an "Anti-Spider Squad" to capture Spider-Man. Spider-Man responds by taking his superhero work into overdrive, committing heroic deeds all over the city simply to enrage Jameson. Jameson responds by putting his squad on double-shifts, severely straining the city council's budget.

In the "Dark Reign" storyline, with Norman's rise to power, Dark Avengers member Spider-Man (really Mac Gargan) seeks to get revenge on Jameson. When Jameson arrived at his home, he was shocked to find a dead stripper on his bed. When Gargan starts a gang war, Jameson goes to Osborn to help and is given "Spider-Man". He later discovers this Spider-Man has caused the gang war and tries to confront Norman, though Spider-Man's name is cleared when he appears to save the Big Apple Festival from Bullseye, Daken, and the gangs involved. Jameson's popularity jumps from having worked with Spider-Man to solve the problem, though he does not realize during the course of the events that he is dealing with a different Spider-Man.

Jameson also eventually learns that his father is marrying May Parker, something he personally does not like. But, he begrudgingly accepts it in the end. He even offers to pay for their ceremony out of his own pocket, and preside over it. The marriage also technically makes him Peter Parker's brother/cousin, something he very clearly dislikes.

Later, Spider-Man tries to stop the Chameleon from setting off a bomb that would kill thousands. Jameson has his squad wearing Mandroid suits to attack Spider-Man. But, Spider-Man cleverly uses his knowledge of the Mandroid suits to disarm the bomb instead. The squad decide not to follow their orders to arrest Spider-Man. Instead, they let him go. The next day, Jameson is shocked to learn that every member of the squad has resigned, and his aide tells him that Jonah is getting out of control, and that Spider-Man's heroics do not deserve a criminal's treatment. When Jameson yells about how much the public has to see Spider-Man as a menace, the aide snaps that this was not the Daily Bugle. The aide then turns in his own resignation, telling Jameson that he has to choose between Spider-Man or actually helping the city.

Jameson later gives a financial bailout to Dexter Bennett to keep the Bugle afloat. This leads to a public backlash which the villain Electro uses to his advantage. Electro espouses taking down the Bugle. He sees it as a greedy corporation, and draws energy from his citywide supporters by turning on all their electrical appliances. In a showdown with Spider-Man inside the Daily Bugle building, Dexter Bennett is crushed by rubble, and the building is completely destroyed. The destruction of the Bugle's longtime headquarters proves heartbreaking for Jameson, who is upset with his life's work, and all of his memories, being destroyed.

During Spider-Man's encounter with the latest Vulture in Amazing Spider-Man #623–624, it is falsely stated by a mob boss that Jameson was responsible for his creation in order to get that Vulture to attack Jameson. As a result, Spider-Man has to fight with the Vulture to protect Jameson. Security guard Gabriel Graham, whom Jameson did not even know the name of before, gives up his life to protect Jameson from the Vulture. The self-sacrifice of Gabriel Graham greatly affects Jameson, and makes Peter decide to make a doctored photo showing Jameson trying to fight back against the Vulture. While the picture does, in fact, get back support for Jameson from the public, and eventually makes several people admit the truth of the situation, Jameson exposes the picture as a fake, and publicly fires Peter Parker.

During the "Heroic Age" storyline, J. Jonah Jameson witnesses the reformation of the Avengers. and is later targeted by an assassin called the Extremist.

After Spider-Man saves the whole of New York from a bomb planted by Doctor Octopus, Jameson is met by his son and Steve Rogers and talked into holding a ceremony to give Spider-Man the key to the city (much to his chagrin). At the same time, he cashes the shares he owned of the DB, giving the money to Robbie Robertson, so that he can rebuild Front Line into the new Daily Bugle.

During the events of the "Big Time" storyline, Alistair Smythe tried to kill J. Jonah Jameson at the time when Marla hooked Peter up with Max Modell of Horizon Labs. Marla Jameson jumped in front of her husband, saving his life, but died in the process. As he held Marla, Jameson did not blame Spider-Man this time, but instead blamed himself. During the attacks of the villain Massacre, Jameson comforts a boy named Liam who lost his mother when Massacre attacked the bank she was visiting. Jameson plans to have Alistair Smythe receive the death penalty (not only because he is a murderer, but also for what happened to his wife Marla). After Spider-Man defeated Massacre, Spidey kept the NYPD from killing him and instead handed him over to the police. Jameson berated Spider-Man for saving the life of a murderer. However, Spider-Man reminds Jameson of Spider-Man's personal policy that "no one dies".

During the "Spider-Island" storyline, J. Jonah Jameson's popularity as the mayor has plummeted and his Anti-Spider-Man Squad is considered to be a huge tax drain. Jameson is shown to have been infected with spider powers  and soon mutates into a spider-like creature. As this mutated creature, Jameson nearly kills Allistair Smythe, partly due to fact that he was responsible for the death of Jameson's wife. The mayor is eventually cured of the spider-virus, along with the rest of the citizens of New York.

During the Ends of the Earth storyline, Mayor Jameson shuts down Horizon Labs (albeit without a court order) on the accusation that it conducts dangerous experiments and harbors criminals such as Morbius. Max Modell's lawyer Hector Baez had to fight the company's accusations. He places the city under martial law with his Anti-Spider-Man Squad patrolling the streets to prevent any looting during the "Ends of the Earth" storyline. However, when Horizon Labs returns as heroes, Jameson is forced to re-open their New York facilities to save face, though he still demands the expulsion of Morbius.

Working with Superior Spider-Man
After Superior Spider-Man (Doctor Octopus' mind in Spider-Man's body) stops the Sinister Six, Mayor J. Jonah Jameson comes to thank him personally, while Peter Parker's consciousness is shocked to see Jameson's drastically changed attitude towards the hero. On the top of the police station building Jameson, Chief Pratchett and Carlie Cooper stand near to the improvised "Spider-Signal". Jameson boasts about his wise ruling policy while Carlie doubts Superior Spider-Man will ever show up. But he finally does and short-circuits the signal. Jameson discharges oaths about wasted taxpayer dollars, and Superior Spider-Man explains they can hinder him using the signal, humiliating Jameson between the lines. When Massacre rigs the doors of Grand Central Station to explode, this even worries Jameson. While speaking in a press conference, Jameson is suddenly attacked by criminal pranksters Jester and Screwball who assault their victims and broadcast it through the internet in a web-show called "Jested" (similar to popular TV show Punk'd). Both pranksters humiliate Jameson and transmit it all over the world, where even Superior Spider-Man laughs it off. Then he gets summoned by Jameson himself to the City Hall where he asks him to arrest Jester and Screwball. Superior Spider-Man dismisses it at first, but after Jameson reminded him of all the times Superior Spider-Man has pulled pranks on him (and even Otto remembers Peter's quips against him), he agrees to catch them putting his Patrol App on course. Superior Spider-Man beats up Jester and Screwball where his brutality being watched all over the city including Jameson (who is enjoying the punishment).

Jameson argues with his father about the actions of Superior Spider-Man. Jameson later enlists Superior Spider-Man to help oversee the execution of Alistair Smythe. Jameson arrives to the Raft for a final inspection before Smythe's execution, where he has told that all of the Raft's inmates will be transferred once Jameson shuts it down, highlighting the infirmary where Boomerang, Vulture and Scorpion are being attended. Jameson, alongside Superior Spider-Man, his assistant Glory Grant and Bugle reporter Norah Jones, watch the procedure of Smythe's execution, while he claims to be a "better person"

Jameson reflecting on the moment whose Smythe killed his wife Marla right in front on him, sadly proclaiming that he will not keep the promise to fulfill her dying wish until Smythe dies, swearing that he will not leave the island. After Smythe's escape, Jameson, Glory Grant, Norah Winters, and the remaining civilians are surrounded by Superior Spider-Man's Spider-Bots and then are informed by Otto (in a pre-recorded hologram) that he has taken measures to counteract any attempt of escape so his Spider-Bots will safeguard them in a force field while the reinforcements arrive, but Jonah refuses to stand still inside the force field, willing to go and help Superior Spider-Man against Smythe. When Smythe has the upper hand over Superior Spider-Man, Jameson poses as a prison guard to narrowly shoot Smythe. Superior Spider-Man accuses Jameson of leaving the force field, but Jameson confronts Superior Spider-Man to tell him he brought him to ensure that Smythe gets executed by any means necessary, implying that he has giving permission to Superior Spider-Man to directly kill him. Superior Spider-Man accepts and tells Jameson to go back to the force field with the others. Smythe sends Scorpion to target Jameson. Jameson is assaulted by Scorpion who was more than willing to kill him only to be stopped by the Lizard. Once aboard the rescue boat, Jameson prepares himself for a press conference musing that he will be happy once the Raft is destroyed. Superior Spider-Man sways him apart and tells him that he should give him the Raft for his new base of operations. Jameson refuses only to be blackmailed by Superior Spider-Man with a recording of their meeting at the Raft where Jameson grants permission to Superior Spider-Man to kill Smythe. Fearing the repercussions (and in the process reigniting his hatred towards Superior Spider-Man), Jameson agrees and makes the announcement in his press conference where he publicly gives Superior Spider-Man the Raft as his new Super Hero Headquarters which Superior Spider-Man rechristens it as "Spider-Island II".

During the attacks of the Goblin King's Goblin Underground, Mayor Jameson unveils the Goblin-Slayers (which Mary Jane thinks might be former Spider-Slayers) which he plans to use to combat the Goblin threat. Jameson orders to send one of the Goblin Slayers to the robbery location and then head to chase Superior Spider-Man. His Spider-Slayers confront Superior Spider-Man as Spider-Slayers with Jameson's face projected on the front faceplate. Jameson replies that he is done with being blackmailed by him and does not care if Jameson loses everything as long as he can finally bring down Superior Spider-Man, but his Spider-Slayers are reactivated by Green Goblin and voice rings out declaring that he has taken control of the Spider-Slayers as Green Goblin comments that Norman Osborn now runs this city. In New York City Hall, Jameson is coming under heavy fire for the fact that his Spider-Slayers have turned against the people. He tries to blame Alchemax, but his accusations are swiftly rebuked by Liz Allan who appears via video link declares that Alchemax is severing all ties with Jameson. Jameson shows his frustration for his personal downfall after the Spider Slayers' failure, but Tiberius Stone uses this as a chance to sell them as weapons to other nations. In the aftermath, Spider-Man is restored to his body Octavius sacrificing his own mind to bring Peter back as he recognizes that Peter Parker is the true Spider-Man and Green Goblin's plan is thwarted, Spider-Man visiting Jameson's office to confront him after what happened and returns him the Spider-Bot that Doctor Octopus used to record his blackmail material. Jameson replies that he will not accept it since he would not believe whatever Spider-Man says, regarding him now as a "monster" that does not own up to the consequences of his actions and instead stomps on others. Spider-Man replies that he will not expect him to believe this but says that he should not fear him, and should not take the blame for everything that Green Goblin caused, but to stay and fight. Once Spider-Man leaves, Jameson reveals that he had already resigned his post as Mayor of New York City and leaves the office, promising that from now on he will kick back.

A new direction
During the Original Sin storyline, the eye of the murdered Uatu the Watcher revealed that J. Jonah Jameson had fired a former Daily Bugle employee for viewing an embarrassing article that he wrote in which he praised Spider-Man in his early days of being a wrestler. Jameson later established the Fact Channel. As Silk battles against Electro and Spider-Man deals with Black Cat, Jameson remains on the channel forcing the cameraman to film the action. Black Cat deviate one of Electro's bolts hitting Spider-Man, knocking him down in the process. Black Cat attempts to unmask Spider-Man as Jameson (who hears the truth concerning Doctor Octopus) aims the camera. However, Jameson's angle prevents anyone seeing Spider-Man's face long enough for Silk to knock Black Cat back and Spider-Man to put his mask back on. He would later be seen taking charge of the Fact Channel's operations acting like he was head of the company and taking interest in Silk.

Following Regent's defeat and Betty Brant's exposé, Jameson brags to Glory Grant that their days at the Daily Bugle was when real journalism had happened. Jameson and Peter Parker later got word that his estranged father Jay coughed up blood and collapsed.

While visiting his father in a private room at Mount Sinai Hospital at the start of the Dead No More: The Clone Conspiracy storyline, Jameson accuses Peter where their traveling around the world might have caused him to catch some type of disease. Jay calms his son down. Jameson was visited by the doctor of New U Technologies upon being called in by his father's doctor. Jameson suspects that there is a "price" for this and storms off. Later on, Jameson visits New U Technologies to speak to the doctor. In order to give proof to Jameson that their talents of using a subject's DNA to clone replacement parts work, Jameson is surprised when the doctor calls in an apparent revived Marla Jameson. With his father's health having taken a turn for the worse, Peter has to endure Jameson's and May's concerns for his extreme skepticism for using New U, with his secret identity preventing him from informing them of the real reason he doubts them. Peter remains adamant of sticking to the conventional procedure and Jay has sided with him. Peter's superheroic endeavors prevent him from accompanying May and Jameson as Jay's health reaches critical status and he undergoes conventional surgery. To make matters worse, this is not enough and Jay passes away.

It is revealed that the revived Marla Jameson is a clone that the Jackal had gathered to grow clones with false memories that span all the way to their deaths. Later, Jameson was granted a revived clone of Mattie Franklin. When Jameson wants one of his workers to investigate the New U scenario in San Francisco, Cindy volunteers to go to get away from the city as Hector Cervantez (now calling himself Spectro) accompanies her. Jameson is enthusiastic for her that her family is back together and leaves for dinner, but Cindy found something off about his behavior. Cindy's suspicions are confirmed when she finds Jameson talking with his formerly-deceased wife while Spectro finds a room with a number of test subjects in capsules. Cindy is then approached in her apartment by Jameson. Cindy gives him Rafferty and Lola's research to voice skepticism on the New U Technologies and Jameson invites her to join him on a quick trip to the facility. He tells Cindy that he believes they are doing good work and introduces her to Mattie and Marla.

After J. Jonah Jameson is taken to Haven with his clone wife, he asked the Jackal to revive his father. Jackal told him to head upstairs in order to promote New U Technologies on television. When Jameson is about to send out a broadcast message of the New U Technologies, Jackal reactivated the broadcast to tell the world that they will all die and be reborn as the Carrion Virus in all of the clones and causes them to start rapidly decaying. Jameson's broadcast causes the Carrion Virus to start spreading worldwide. Spider-Man and Anna Maria Marconi arrive to stop the broadcast as Mattie reveals to Jameson her superpowers. After Spider-Man sends out the Webware Emergency Signal, Jameson and Silk find Marla and Mattie reduced to dust. Following the Carrion Virus being thwarted, Jameson is heartbroken as Spider-Man and Anna arrive. Jameson pleads to Spider-Man not to tell Peter that he was right about his suspicion towards New U Technologies. Afterwards, Jameson clean his office after he is fired by the Fact Channel.

Following a tense confrontation with Spider-Man provoked by a rogue branch of S.H.I.E.L.D., Spider-Man agreed to an exclusive interview with Jameson that culminated in the wall-crawler revealing his secret identity, prompting Jameson to vow to be more supportive of the hero's efforts in future.

During the Secret Empire storyline, J. Jonah Jameson was in Manhattan at the time when Baron Helmut Zemo used the Darkhold to amplify Blackout's powers to surround the city in Darkforce following Hydra's takeover of the United States. When Kraven the Hunter raided the Daily Bugle looking for information on the identity of Spider-Man, Phil Sheldon's daughter Jennie ran to warn Jameson thinking that he could be in danger. When Jameson was attacked by Kraven the Hunter, Jennie Sheldon fired a signal flare into the sky enough to attract the attention of Spider-Woman who defeated Kraven the Hunter.

Jameson is later abducted by Norman Osborn in order to find out who Spider-Man is. Osborn takes a brief interval from the torture to kill Phil Urich as the self-proclaimed Goblin King tried to raid one of his old storehouses. After Osborn suited up as the Green Goblin, Jameson informed the villain that he could not stop Spider-Man since Gwen Stacy's death. Those words made Norman remember that Spider-Man is Peter Parker, breaking the mental block on Spider-Man's identity. This left Jameson devastated at what he has done. Jameson into helping defend Spider-Man's inner circle against Osborn, who has bonded himself with the Carnage symbiote to become the Red Goblin. Jameson sends Venom to defend Mary Jane at the Stark Tower. Jameson and Superior Octopus later help to defend Aunt May from Red Goblin where Jameson operates an older version of the Spider-Slayer. When Spider-Man removes the Carnage symbiote from Green Goblin, Spider-Man persuades Jameson not to shoot him.

Family members

|-
|style="text-align: left;"|Notes:Here are the known family members of J. Jonah Jameson:

 David Jameson Burnoll — The stepfather of J. Jonah Jameson. Later revealed to be also his paternal uncle, having taken his wife's name after she left Jay Jameson for him.
 J. Jonah "Jay" Jameson, Sr. — The estranged father of J. Jonah Jameson. He later becomes married to Aunt May. In The Clone Conspiracy storyline, Jay later died in the hospital.
 Betty Burnoll — The mother of J. Jonah Jameson.
 Joan Jameson — The first wife of J. Jonah Jameson.
 John Jameson — The son of J. Jonah Jameson who works as an astronaut.
 Marla Madison — The second wife of J. Jonah Jameson. She was later killed by Alistair Smythe.
 Peter Parker — The step-cousin (self-declared step-brother) of J. Jonah Jameson.
 May Parker — The step-mother of J. Jonah Jameson, and maternal aunt (and adoptive mother) of Peter Parker.
 Jennifer Walters — The daughter-in-law of J. Jonah Jameson and ex-wife of John Jameson.
 Martha "Mattie" Franklin — The adoptive daughter and biological niece of J. Jonah Jameson who is secretly the superhero Spider-Woman. She is later killed by Sasha Kravinoff.
 Jerry Franklin — The brother-in-law of J. Jonah Jameson, husband of Bernice and father of Mattie, who is in a cult with Norman Osborn, Morris Maxwell, Cassandra Webb, and Gregory Herd.
 Bernice Franklin — The deceased younger sister of Marla Madison, wife of Jerry and mother of Mattie.
 Mary Jane Watson — The ex-fiancée of John Jameson in Sam Raimi's Spider-Man 2 (2004).

Other versions
1602
In 1602: New World, the sequel to Marvel 1602, Jameson is an Irish colonist and friend of Ananias Dare. He prints the Roanoke Colony's newspaper, The Daily Trumpet, with the assistance of Peter Parquagh, whom he orders to learn more about the mysterious "Spider", believing him to be a threat to the colony.

Amalgam
In the Amalgam Comics universe, Jameson runs the Bugle like a sensationalist tabloid, with the majority of its front-page stories revolving around Spider-Boy's love life. He is unaware that Pete Ross, his favorite photographer, is really Spider-Boy.

Earth X
In the alternate reality of Earth X, everyone on Earth has been affected by the Terrigen Mists, granting everyone superpowers. Jameson is turned into a humanoid donkey (a human body with an equine head). It is also revealed that after he published information exposing Peter Parker as Spider-Man, his reputation was ruined, as no one trusted a man who had spent years paying the very hero he called a menace, and the Daily Bugle has gone bankrupt. He has captured Jack Russell (Werewolf by Night) in the old Bugle offices and brings him food, presumably either having mistaken Russell for his son John, the Man-Wolf or feeling fatherly toward another lycanthrope and reminiscing about his son.

G.I. Joe
In the original Marvel Universe-set G.I. Joe comic series, Jameson is seen hassling a news vendor for the seeming lack of any Daily Bugle papers.

House of M
In the "House of M" reality created by the insane Scarlet Witch and in which mutants are dominant over baseline humans, Jameson is the maltreated publicist of Peter Parker, here a celebrity without a secret identity. Despising Peter and only keeping his job for the pay, Jameson gets his chance to completely ruin his boss when the Green Goblin gives him Peter's old journal. Learning that Peter is a mutate instead of a mutant, Jameson reveals this to the populace of the world, who come to hate Peter for having only pretended to be a mutant. He is left grieving and guilt-ridden when Spider-Man appears to have killed himself.

MC2
In the MC2 continuity, an alternate future of the mainstream Marvel Universe, Jonah is still the publisher of The Daily Bugle. His wife, Marla is still alive. He hires May Parker, the daughter of Peter, as a photographer. Ironically, he is very supportive of Spider-Girl, in contrast to his stance on her father (in the MC2 continuity, Spider-Man's identity was never made public). He also supported "Project Human Fly", another attempt to create a superhero, this time in response to the death of Joseph "Robbie" Robertson at the hands of Doctor Octopus. When "Buzz" Bannon, the intended subject of Project Human Fly, is murdered and the suit stolen, he immediately condemns The Buzz, the identity assumed by the person who stole the suit. However, he is unaware that his own grandson, Jack "J.J." Jameson and The Buzz are one and the same person.

Spider-Man: Reign
In the Marvel Knights four-issue series Spider-Man: Reign, set 35 years in the future, an elderly Jameson is seen returning to a totalitarian New York, with the mission of convincing a middle age Peter Parker to return as Spider-Man to save the city from being enclosed by Mayor Waters' WEBB security system. After attacking Reign officers, he is saved by the newly returned Spider-Man. Jonah next rounds up groups of children to join his cause to save the city, as they print about Spider-Man's return. Eventually Jonah is captured by the Reign and brought to the mayor's office, where he confirms his suspicions, finding out that Venom is behind the WEBB project as a means of trapping the citizens of New York, so that they can be fed on by itself and other symbiotes. After Spider-Man defeats Venom, and destroys the WEBB, Jonah is seen on television proclaiming that freedom has returned to the city.

Marvel Zombies
In the alternate universe of Marvel Zombies, Jameson is eaten by the zombified Spider-Man in his own office, when Zombie Spider-Man confronts him. In Marvel Zombies, it proves that he was right about Spider-Man being a menace. This occurs right after Spider-Man remarks he was "going to enjoy this part".

Spider-Man Noir
In Spider-Man Noir, Jameson remains the owner of the Daily Bugle. However, he is seemingly under the thumb of Norman Osborn, the "Goblin" and kills Ben Urich to prevent him from publishing evidence against Goblin. It is soon revealed that this was in fact the Chameleon, who abducted Jameson for the Goblin. Jonah was saved by Spider-Man from being eaten by Kraven's Siberian tiger.

Fairy Tales
Issue #1 of Spider-Man: Fairy Tales follows the fairy tale of Little Red Riding Hood. Mary Jane takes the part of Little Red Riding Hood, and Peter is one of the woodsmen. Jameson is the leader of the woodsmen, who also include Osborn and Flash Thompson.

Spider-Verse
In Spider-Verse, Jameson was giving Peter Parker a call in order to demand that he go to Armstrong Park in order to take a picture of a new villain that had just appeared. This reality has humans living on the moon. In another reality, Jameson's wife, Marla was saved from Alistair Smythe by the Spider-Man version of Ben Reilly. The article that followed said event as well as the newspaper itself had a positive story about how the Spider-Man version of Ben Reilly in that reality was a true hero.

Spider-Gwen
On Earth-65, J. Jonah Jameson is the Mayor of New York City. He held a press conference against Spider-Woman after she presumably killed Peter Parker.

Marvel 2099
In Marvel 2099 on an alternate unnamed reality, an aged J. Jonah Jameson was apparently alive in the year 2099 where he was the new CEO of Alchemax. He is responsible for passage of the Anti-Powers Act which calls for the forcible arrest and depowering of all non-conforming superpower individuals. Eventually, it is revealed that he is a shape-shifting Skrull operative who was fully brainwashed into believing he was Jameson.

Ultimate Marvel
In Ultimate Spider-Man and Ultimate Comics: Spider-Man, Jameson is essentially the same character as the original version, although younger in appearance. Jameson decries Spider-Man and other vigilantes, accusing them of being fraudulent hero figures in contrast to his astronaut son, who was killed during a mission. While Jameson does not necessarily hate Spider-Man, he has no qualms about painting him in a negative light to sell papers. Despite his adverse attitude towards Spider-Man, this version of Jonah still ends up unwittingly hiring Peter Parker to work at the Daily Bugle as its webmaster. During the "Ultimatum" storyline, Jameson drops his vendetta against Spider-Man after losing his wife in a massive flood that engulfs Manhattan and later witnessing Spider-Man rescuing other flood victims. Feeling ashamed and regretful of his smear campaign, Jameson vows to dedicate his life towards portraying Spider-Man as the hero he really is, and begins by publishing several pro-Spider-Man stories Ben Urich held onto. Subsequently, Jameson deduces Spider-Man's true identity, but following the trauma of being kidnapped, along with Spider-Man, by the Chameleons, and being shot in the head, Jameson comes to believe that it is his God-given duty to protect and aid Spider-Man. After the death of Peter Parker, and the assumption of his mantle by the second Spider-Man, Miles Morales, Jameson, when told by investigative reporter Betty Brant that she has discovered his secret identity (though she incorrectly concludes that Morales' father, Jefferson Davis, is Spider-Man), Jameson refuses to publish her theory, explaining that doing so would not illuminate any truth for the benefit of readers, but would only ruin a family's life and deprive the city of another hero. Jameson was later murdered by Norman Osborn in his Goblin form.

What If?
J. Jonah Jameson appeared in various issues of What If?, which imagines changes to Marvel continuity during crucial points in history. What If? #24 of the first volume
(December 1980), in which Jameson exposes Spider-Man's secret identity to the public, is one of the most highly regarded stories of the series. Issue #82 of the second volume ponders history had Jameson adopted Parker. While this version of Jonah is actually more supportive of Peter, he still harbors his hatred of Spider-Man, until he has a change of heart. In another issue that imagines history had Parker's uncle, Ben Parker, not died as a result of Parker's initial lack of responsibility, Spider-Man becomes a successful entertainer, and uses his wealth and influence to shut down Jameson's paper and ruin his life. Jameson in turn becomes a criminal who organizes the Sinister Six to get revenge on Spider-Man.

Spider-Man: Life Story
Jameson appeared in the miniseries Spider-Man: Life Story, which explores how Spider-Man and the Marvel Universe at large would be if it were not set in a floating timeline. In the first issue, set in the 1960s, Jameson is shown to be under stress from the police due to their investigation into his involvement with the creation of the Spider-Slayers and Scorpion, resulting in him berating and mistreating his staff more than usual. In the fifth issue, it is revealed that Jameson died shortly before 9-11, and Peter Parker was attending his funeral during the incident, leaving to help in the rescue efforts.

Jameson's life in this continuity is explored in the annual. In 1966, he is arrested by George Stacy after Scorpion confessed to Jameson's role in his creation. He befriends Norman Osborn and begins writing a memoir. His vendetta against Spider-Man pushes away anyone close to him, including his son and Parker as he continues to insist the wall-crawler is a menace. During his prison term, he mostly confides with the prison therapist, Helen Carroll, who is secretly a clone of Gwen Stacy trying to help other 'victims' of costumed heroes. In 2001, Jameson is finally released from prison and follows the deceased Norman's instructions to a warehouse, where he finds an upgraded version of the Spider-Slayer suit. Rather than get revenge on Spider-Man, he uses it to take out the Scorpion as he saw the villain as his greatest mistake. He dies shortly after killing Gargan. At his funeral, Helen gives Peter Jameson's completed memoir: "Webs: Untangling A Life".

In other media
Television
 J. Jonah Jameson appears in Spider-Man (1967), voiced by Paul Kligman. This version is an egotistical, greedy, and cowardly braggart who constantly berates his employees and automatically accuses Spider-Man of any crime, even when the evidence contradicts him. While he maintains these traits throughout the series, the season two prequel episode "King Pinned" portrays Jameson's attitude toward Spider-Man as being originally warmer, even going as far as to stand up to the Kingpin, help the web-slinger defeat him, and expose the Kingpin's drug counterfeiting racket during their first meeting.
 J. Jonah Jameson appears in Spider-Man (1977) and The Amazing Spider-Man (1978), portrayed by David White and Robert F. Simon respectively. Both versions of his abrasive, flamboyant personality are toned down as he is portrayed as a more avuncular figure.
 J. Jonah Jameson appears in Spider-Man (1981), voiced by Bill Woodson. This version has a sniveling nephew named Mortimer, who also works at the Daily Bugle.
 J. Jonah Jameson appears in Spider-Man and His Amazing Friends, voiced again by Bill Woodson.
 J. Jonah Jameson appears in Spider-Man: The Animated Series, voiced by Ed Asner. This version's dislike of Spider-Man is based less on his powers and deeds and more on his hiding his identity behind a mask as his wife was killed by a masked gunman. The series also portrays his integrity as a journalist as he refuses to cover up the truth even when it is in his best interests and demonstrates loyalty to his employees, such as helping Peter Parker by hiring Matt Murdock as his defense attorney when Parker was framed by Richard Fisk for selling government secrets to foreign powers and aiding Robbie Robertson when the latter is framed for a crime by Tombstone and Fisk.
 An alternate reality version of Jameson who does not hate Spider-Man and became Peter Parker's godfather appears in the series finale "Farewell Spider-Man".
 J. Jonah Jameson briefly appears in the pilot episode of Spider-Man Unlimited (1999), voiced by Richard Newman. 
 J. Jonah Jameson appears in Spider-Man: The New Animated Series voiced by Keith Carradine. This version is portrayed as a cheapskate and his hatred of Spider-Man is primarily evident in the series finale.

 J. Jonah Jameson appears in The Spectacular Spider-Man, voiced by Daran Norris. This version sports a soul patch along with his trademark mustache and displays a level of hyperactivity not seen in any of his previous incarnations as well as an obsession with time, punctuality, and deadlines similar to J. K. Simmons' version. Aside from these traits, he retains his dislike of Spider-Man, though he displays a fondness for Peter Parker, and maintains his cynical, avuncular, brusque attitude with his staff. In season two, Jameson's hatred for Spider-Man is worsened after the former convinces his son John Jameson to become a superhero, only for John to be sent to Ravencroft following a fight with the web-slinger.
 J. Jonah Jameson appears in Ultimate Spider-Man, voiced by J. K. Simmons reprising the role from the Sam Raimi Spider-Man film trilogy. Similarly to his Ultimate Marvel counterpart, this version defaces and mistrusts masked vigilantes while running the news network Daily Bugle Communications.
 The four-part episode, "The Spider-Verse", features several alternate reality versions of Jameson all voiced by Simmons: a Marvel 2099 incarnation, J. Joanna Jameson from a gender-inverted universe, a Marvel Noir incarnation who specializes in radio broadcasts, J. Jonah Jackal from Spider-Ham's universe, a town crier from a medieval-themed universe, and a variation of Jameson's Ultimate Marvel counterpart who views Miles Morales as a menace.
 J. Jonah Jameson appears in The Avengers: Earth's Mightiest Heroes episode "Along Came a Spider", voiced again by J. K. Simmons. Following the Skrulls' invasion, Jameson believes that Captain America betrayed the world, not knowing it was a Skrull disguised as him. Several high-level individuals, such as Tony Stark and the President, attempted to convince him otherwise, but to no avail. Despite this, Jameson is willing to send Peter Parker and Betty Brant to find proof of Captain America's innocence. After Spider-Man and Captain America save people from the Serpent Society, Jameson begrudgingly has the Daily Bugle print the story.
 J. Jonah Jameson appears in Avengers Assemble, voiced again by J. K. Simmons.
 J. Jonah Jameson appears in Hulk and the Agents of S.M.A.S.H., voiced again by J. K. Simmons.
 The five-part episode "Days of Future Smash" features various alternate timeline versions of Jameson all voiced by Simmons: a dinosaur named J. Jonah Jamesasaurus who reports on Spider-Raptor's activities, a vampire who advocates for humans to convert to vampirism, and a HYDRA-affiliated version subservient to the Leader.
 J. Jonah Jameson appears in Marvel Disk Wars: The Avengers.
 J. Jonah Jameson appears in Lego Marvel Super Heroes: Maximum Overload, voiced once more by J. K. Simmons.
 J. Jonah Jameson appears in Spider-Man (2017), voiced by Bob Joles.

 Film 

 James Cameron's original script for what eventually became Spider-Man (2002) depicted Jameson as a TV executive instead of editor-in-chief of the Daily Bugle who has a strong dislike for the titular hero and attempts to defame him. Additionally, Cameron had wanted R. Lee Ermey for the role.
 Jameson does not appear in The Amazing Spider-Man film series, but is referenced as Peter Parker's employer in The Amazing Spider-Man 2 (2014) and tie-in comics. J.K. Simmons, who previously portrayed Jameson in Sam Raimi's Spider-Man trilogy, expressed interest in returning as Jameson for the films.
 Spider-Man: Into the Spider-Verse (2018)'s editorial associate production manager, Adam Brown, voices a version of Jameson inspired by the 1967 Spider-Man TV series in its post-credits scene.

 Raimi films 
Simmons portrays Jameson in Raimi's Spider-Man film trilogy. This version serves as major source of comic relief throughout the films, being portrayed as a blustering, bombastic, obsessed, and hyperactive man retaining his dislike for Spider-Man and taking delight in anything that might discredit or defame him, but remaining a good man at his core.

Marvel Cinematic Universe

J. K. Simmons reprises his role as a re-imagined version of J. Jonah Jameson in live-action media set in Marvel Cinematic Universe (MCU), appearing in the film Spider-Man: Far From Home (2019), The Daily Bugle web series (2019–present), and the film Spider-Man: No Way Home (2021). Simmons also makes an uncredited cameo appearance as the MCU Jameson in the mid-credits scene of the Sony's Spider-Man Universe film Venom: Let There Be Carnage (also 2021).

Introduced in Far From Home, this version is unrelated to the version that Simmons first portrayed in Raimi's trilogy. Instead, this Jameson appears as the host of TheDailyBugle.net, a sensationalist "InfoWars-type video platform". While he has the same hair color as his Raimi films' counterpart, Simmons does not wear a toupée to emulate Jameson's flattop hairstyle; appearing bald instead to differentiate his differing portrayals. Additionally, Simmons announced that he has signed on to play Jameson for more films in the MCU.

Video games
 J. Jonah Jameson appears in The Amazing Spider-Man vs. The Kingpin.
 J. Jonah Jameson appears in Marvel Super Heroes vs. Street Fighter, alongside Robbie Robertson if Spider-Man is one of the fighters in the "Night-Cooking" game show stage. 
 J. Jonah Jameson appears in Spider-Man (2000), voiced by Dee Bradley Baker. Scorpion tries to kill Jameson for his part in creating him, but Spider-Man saves the latter and defeats the former in battle.
 J. Jonah Jameson appears in the Xbox version of Spider-Man (2002), voiced by Jay Gordon.
 J. Jonah Jameson appears in the Spider-Man 2 film tie-in game, voiced again by Jay Gordon. He initially supports Quentin Beck's claims that Spider-Man is a fraud, but accuses the two of working together after learning Beck is Mysterio.
 J. Jonah Jameson appears in the Spider-Man 3 film tie-in game, voiced by J. K. Simmons. He is captured by Luke Carlyle and thrown out of a mid-air helicopter while wearing an electric collar, though Spider-Man rescues him and removes the collar.
 J. Jonah Jameson appears in the Spider-Man pinball machine by Stern Pinball. J. K. Simmons also recorded additional lines of custom speech appropriate for a pinball game, such as "Extra ball", "Jackpot" and "Hey, kid, you just won a free game".
 J. Jonah Jameson appears in the PS2 and PSP versions of Spider-Man: Web of Shadows, voiced again by Daran Norris. Spencer Smythe and A.I.M. capture Jameson so Spencer can clone him and discredit him and Spider-Man.
 J. Jonah Jameson appears in the background of the Daily Bugle stage for Marvel vs. Capcom 3: Fate of Two Worlds. He also appears in Spider-Man's Arcade mode ending, during which he claims to Peter Parker that Spider-Man defeating Galactus is a hoax and that he was actually working with him the entire time.
 J. Jonah Jameson briefly appears in Spider-Man: Edge of Time, voiced by Fred Tatasciore. In the intro cutscene, he criticizes Spider-Man in front of Peter Parker. When Alchemax scientist Walker Sloan changes the timeline, Jameson becomes a controversial late-night TV news anchor.
 J. Jonah Jameson appears in Marvel Heroes, voiced by Kyle Hebert.
 J. Jonah Jameson appears in Lego Marvel Super Heroes, voiced by John DiMaggio.
 J. Jonah Jameson appears in The Amazing Spider-Man 2 film tie-in game, voiced again by Fred Tatasciore.
 J. Jonah Jameson appears in Spider-Man Unlimited (2014), voiced again by Kyle Hebert. He is initially a non-playable character before a mutated version of Jameson from the "Spider-Island" storyline was added as a playable character in a later update.
 J. Jonah Jameson appears in Disney Infinity 2.0: Marvel Super Heroes, voiced again by Kyle Hebert.
 J. Jonah Jameson appears in Marvel vs. Capcom: Infinite on a background monitor in the New Metro City stage, which depicts him on a news channel debating with Mayor Mike Haggar. 
 J. Jonah Jameson appears in Lego Marvel Super Heroes 2, voiced by Glenn Wrage.
 J. Jonah Jameson appears in Insomniac Games' Spider-Man series, voiced by Darin De Paul. Following the events of the tie-in prequel novel Spider-Man: Hostile Takeover, he has begun his own podcast called "Just the Facts with J. Jonah Jameson".
 In Marvel's Spider-Man (2018), he takes the role of a conspiracy theorist, airing his own uncensored, unsubstantiated, personal views on what he feels is wrong with New York. These usually tie back to Spider-Man in some way, such as blaming him for the fallout of Wilson Fisk's arrest and claiming he was in league with the Sinister Six. Another podcast reveals Mac Gargan has filed a lawsuit against the publisher for his role in turning the former into the Scorpion.
 In Spider-Man: Miles Morales (2020), Jameson continues to air his podcast while directing his attention towards the new Spider-Man. He also frequently clashes with Danika Hart, who hosts a pro-Spider-Man podcast called "The Danikast".

Parodies
 Parodies of the Sam Raimi Spider-Man film trilogy incarnation of J. Jonah Jameson appear in The Simpsons, all voiced by J. K. Simmons. In the episode "Moe'N'a Lisa", Simmons guest stars as Jameson, now a publisher who demands pictures, stories, and poems about Spider-Man. In the episode "Homerazzi", Simmons voices a similar character who works as the publisher of The Springfield Inquisitor. In the episode "3 Scenes Plus a Tag from a Marriage", Simmons voices J.J. Gruff, Marge Simpson's editor.
 On VH1's ILL-Ustrateds Spider-Man 2 parody, J. Jonah Jameson is portrayed as a Dr. Dre look-alike.
 A parody of J. Jonah Jameson based on J. K. Simmons' performance appears in the live-action film Superhero Movie. This character is a mental patient from a hospital that shares a building with a newspaper company; yelling that hamburgers can tell the future, he knows the mayor of Venus, and he can start fires with his mind.
 Two characters inspired by J. Jonah Jameson, based on J. K. Simmons' performance, appear in the Ben 10 television series Ben 10: Ultimate Alien and Ben 10: Omniverse: J. Jonah "Jimmy" Jones (voiced by Scott Menville), a child who exposes Ben Tennyson's identity to the world in the former series' pilot episode, and Will Harangue' (voiced by John DiMaggio), a news anchor and host of Harangue Nation, who declares Tennyson a "menace" to society and often attempts to have him killed (adapting the Marvel Comics' Spider-Slayers storyline); Harangue's physical design is inspired by Senator Kelly.
 J. K. Simmons reprises his role of J. Jonah Jameson in the Robot Chicken animated series episode "Gimme That Chocolate Milk". He is seen at a press conference held by the Mayor of Santa Fe revolving around the 2018 Santa Fe High School shooting. After April O'Neil talks about asking if they can have the Teenage Mutant Ninja Turtles in the area, Jameson demands that the mayor has Spider-Man arrested. The second sketch has Peter Parker giving Jameson his latest picture of Spider-Man, which the latter adds to his secret room of Spider-Man pictures as he secretly likes him.

Novelizations
 J. Jonah Jameson appears in the 1978 novel Mayhem in Manhattan, written by Len Wein and Marv Wolfman.
 Reference is made to J. Jonah Jameson in the 2005 Fantastic Four film novelization, although the character is never explicitly named as such. After he and his team save people on a bridge, Mister Fantastic is shown on numerous television channels talking about the Fantastic Four and recognizes a man with a small mustache. This is accompanied by the headline FANTASTIC FOUR: HEROES OR MENACE, which came from the owner of a major newspaper.
 J. Jonah Jameson appears in the prequel novel to the 2018 video game Marvel's Spider-Man, Spider-Man: Hostile Takeover. Having retired from the Daily Bugle some time ago, Echo convinces Jameson to launch a radio segment, which he plans to use to help turn the public's opinion against Spider-Man. After learning Echo's funding came from the Kingpin and following the crime lord's public fall from grace, Jameson immediately cuts all ties with them and subsequently plans to launch his own independent podcast.

Theatre
Michael Mulheren plays J. Jonah Jameson in the Broadway musical Spider-Man: Turn Off the Dark.

Theme parks
J. Jonah Jameson appears in The Amazing Adventures of Spider-Man at Islands of Adventure, voiced by Chris Edgerly. With the Daily Bugle''s staff having fled due to an attack by the Sinister Syndicate, Jameson recruits the riders to cover the story. At the end of the ride, Jameson is seen floating in his office due to Doctor Octopus' anti-gravity cannon.

References

External links
 J. Jonah Jameson at Marvel.com
 Marvel Directory entry
 

Characters created by Stan Lee
Characters created by Steve Ditko
Comics characters introduced in 1963
Fictional characters from New York City
Fictional donkeys
Fictional magazine editors
Fictional mayors
Fictional misers
Fictional newspaper editors
Fictional newspaper publishers (people)
Fictional reporters
Marvel Comics film characters
Marvel Comics male supervillains
Spider-Man characters